Calvin Kerr Wallace (born April 17, 1965) is a former American football defensive end who played professionally in the National Football League (NFL).

Biography
Wallace was born on April 17, 1965 in Montgomery, West Virginia.

Career
Wallace was a member of the Green Bay Packers during the 1987 NFL season. He played college football at the West Virginia University Institute of Technology.

See also
 List of Green Bay Packers players

References

1965 births
Living people
American football defensive ends
Green Bay Packers players
West Virginia Tech Golden Bears football players
People from Montgomery, West Virginia
Players of American football from West Virginia